Anthony January (born June 16, 1993) is an American  professional basketball player that currently plays for Prawira Bandung of the Indonesian Basketball League (IBL).

Early life 
January was born in Los Angeles to Anthony January Sr. and Pamela Green.

High school and college career 
January played his first three years of high school basketball at Compton High School. He played his final season at William Howard Taft High School (Los Angeles, California), during which he earned West Valley League MVP, and CIF Los Angeles City Section Player of the year award averaging 22 points and 13 rebounds after gaining eligibility following his transfer from Compton.

Professional career
January has played for PEA of the Thailand Basketball League, Cactus Tbilisi of the Georgian Superliga, and BC Mažeikiai of the National Basketball League of Lithuania. In 2019 January signed with the Danang Dragons. In 2021, he played for Team Cali of the Colombian league, averaging 16.5 points, 8.5 rebounds, and 1.0 assist per game. On October 4, 2021, he signed with Khaneh Basketball Khuzestan of the Iranian Basketball Super League.

References

External links
 RealGM profile

1993 births
Living people
American expatriate basketball people in Argentina
American expatriate basketball people in Colombia
American expatriate basketball people in Georgia (country)
American expatriate basketball people in Lithuania
American expatriate basketball people in Mexico
American expatriate basketball people in Vietnam
American men's basketball players
Basketball players from Compton, California
Cal State San Bernardino Coyotes men's basketball players
Cerritos Falcons men's basketball players
Ferro Carril Oeste basketball players
Forwards (basketball)
New Mexico State Aggies men's basketball players
Ostioneros de Guaymas (basketball) players
Tijuana Zonkeys players